"What Is the Best Work of American Fiction of the Last 25 Years?" is an informal opinion poll conducted in 2006 by the New York Times Book Review (NYTBR) to determine "the single best work of American fiction published in the last 25 years." Eligible works were those written by an American author and published during the quarter-century period from 1980 through 2005. The poll was conducted by NYTBR editor Sam Tanenhaus, who sent letters to literary figures requesting their participation and received 124 responses. The results were published on May 21, 2006, in the Sunday edition of the New York Times. An essay by A. O. Scott, titled "In Search of the Best", reflected on the results and the premise of the "Great American Novel".

Toni Morrison's 1987 novel Beloved received the most votes, a result that had been anticipated by Tanenhaus, Scott, and several poll participants. The runners-up were the novels Underworld (1997) by Don DeLillo; a tie for third place between Blood Meridian (1985) by Cormac McCarthy and Rabbit Angstrom: A Tetralogy (1995) by John Updike; and American Pastoral (1997) by Philip Roth. The full list featured another 17 works that garnered at least two votes; some books with only one vote were later identified in other sources. Works by Roth received more total votes than those by any other author.

The poll spurred vigorous debate and a wide range of commentary on the status of an American literary canon. Critics of the poll found its results to be unrepresentative of the breadth of contemporary American literature, noting apparent biases against—for example—women's writing, regionalist literature, or genre fiction. Taking inspiration from the exercise, The Observer conducted its own poll for the best novel published during the same timespan by a writer from Britain, Ireland, or the Commonwealth, with J. M. Coetzee's  Disgrace (1999) emerging as the winner.

Poll

Results 
In early 2006, Tanenhaus sent a letter "to a couple of hundred prominent writers, critics, editors and other literary sages" requesting participating in the poll. Participants were invited to submit their single choice for the best work of American fiction from 1980 to 2005; submissions with more than one selection or ranked lists were not accepted. The NYTBR offered poll respondents "confidentiality, though not anonymity", in that it would publish the names of those who participated in the poll while maintaining the secrecy of ballots.

The poll results were announced on May 18, 2006, ahead of the BookExpo America trade fair in Washington, D.C., before appearing in print on May 21. That week's edition of the NYTBR was exclusively devoted to fiction works, and the magazine's cover illustration features the cover art of 22 books from the poll results. The published results included the winner, four runners-up, and 17 works of literature that received at least two votes. Beloved by Toni Morrison received the most votes. The list as published did not reveal who voted for any given work, nor did it provide the number of votes received by a given work. However, Scott's accompanying essay provided the tallies of votes received by the top five works, as well as noting that works by Philip Roth had received more total votes than those by any other author, with 21 votes overall spread across seven novels (six of which received multiple votes).

After the poll results were published, the National Book Critics Circle (NBCC) contacted poll respondents and were able to identify some works receiving a single vote. The list below includes the results published in the NYTBR plus any works known to have received only a single vote.

Participants 
The names of 124 poll respondents were printed in the NYTBR. Although the NYTBR did not reveal any voter's selection, several respondents chose to publicly disclose the title of the work for which they cast their vote after the list was published. If known, a participant's poll response is provided below in a footnote.

 Kurt Andersen
 Roger Angell
 A. Manette Ansay
 James Atlas
 Russell Banks
 John Banville
 Julian Barnes
 Andrea Barrett
 Rick Bass
 Ann Beattie
 Madison Smartt Bell
 Aimee Bender
 Paul Berman
 Sven Birkerts
 Harold Bloom
 Bill Buford
 Ethan Canin
 Philip Caputo
 Michael Chabon
 Susan Choi
 Mark Costello
 Michael Cunningham
 Edwidge Danticat
 Don DeLillo
 Pete Dexter
 Junot Diaz
 Morris Dickstein
 Andre Dubus III
 Tony Earley
 Richard Eder
 Jennifer Egan
 Dave Eggers
 Lucy Ellmann
 Nathan Englander
 Louise Erdrich
 Anne Fadiman
 Henry Finder
 Jonathan Safran Foer
 Paula Fox
 Nell Freudenberger
 Carlos Fuentes
 David Gates
 Henry Louis Gates Jr.
 Julia Glass
 Nadine Gordimer
 Mary Gordon
 Robert Gottlieb
 Philip Gourevitch
 Elizabeth Graver
 Andrew Sean Greer
 Allan Gurganus
 Jim Harrison
 Kathryn Harrison
 Alice Hoffman
 A. M. Homes
 Maureen Howard
 John Irving
 Ha Jin
 Thom Jones
 Heidi Julavits
 Ward Just
 Mary Karr
 William Kennedy
 Frank Kermode
 Stephen King
 Maxine Hong Kingston
 Walter Kirn
 Benjamin Kunkel
 David Leavitt
 Chang-Rae Lee
 Brad Leithauser
 Frank Lentricchia
 John Leonard
 Jonathan Lethem
 Alan Lightman
 David Lodge
 Ralph Lombreglia
 Phillip Lopate
 Janet Malcolm
 Thomas Mallon
 Ben Marcus
 Peter Matthiessen
 Ian McEwan
 David Means
 Daphne Merkin
 Stephen Metcalf
 Rick Moody
 Lorrie Moore
 Geoffrey O'Brien
 Chris Offutt
 Stewart O'Nan
 David Orr
 Cynthia Ozick
 Ann Patchett
 Tom Perrotta
 Richard Gid Powers
 William Pritchard
 Francine Prose
 Terrence Rafferty
 Marilynne Robinson
 Roxana Robinson
 Norman Rush
 Richard Russo
 George Saunders
 Liesl Schillinger
 Joanna Scott
 Jim Shepard
 Karen Shepard
 David Shields
 Gary Shteyngart
 Lee Siegel
 Curtis Sittenfeld
 Jane Smiley
 Wole Soyinka
 Scott Spencer
 William Styron
 Studs Terkel
 Deborah Treisman
 Anne Tyler
 Mario Vargas Llosa
 William T. Vollmann
 Edmund White
 Tom Wolfe
 Tobias Wolff

The following people were among those who had been invited to participate in the poll, but ultimately declined to respond:
 Laura Miller
 Meghan O'Rourke

Response 

The eventual victory of Beloved did not come as a shock to Times staffers who were involved with the project. "It's a very controversial book and a controversial choice," Tanenhaus said in an interview with Book TV, "although not altogether surprising. And in fact, we heard from a few voters who predicted Beloved would win—even as they cast votes for other books." In his essay accompanying the poll, titled "In Search of the Best", A. O. Scott wrote,  results—in some respects quite surprising, in others not at all—provide a rich, if partial and unscientific, picture of the state of American literature, a kind of composite self-portrait as interesting perhaps for its blind spots and distortions as for its details." Of the poll winner, Beloved, Scott said:

A year after the poll's publication, Lawrence Buell remarked that it had "occasioned an amazing amount of comment" on the topic of the Great American Novel. Sara Nelson, then editor-in-chief of Publishers Weekly, wrote of the poll: "There's no doubt about it: I envy Tanenhaus this publicity—and perhaps advertising-generating vehicle, even if he does say that the winning publishers have not been alerted in advance, à la Oprah, and therefore are unlikely to buy extra ads in the issue. Cash investment or no, to be named the New York Times Book Reviews best fiction of the last 25 years has to be a brand-builder for both the winner and its bestower." The poll has been cited as a prominent example of the influence of the media on the construction of literary canons, alongside other institutional influences such as academia, governmental agencies, nonprofit organizations, libraries, and publishing companies.

On May 22, 2006, the public radio show Open Source, hosted by Christopher Lydon, invited literary critics James Wood, Mark Greif, Ruth Franklin, and Dennis Loy Johnson to discuss and analyze the poll results. The 2010 conference of the American Literature Association (ALA) hosted a panel discussion on the poll results, with one panelist representing the literary society of each of the top five authors in the poll as follows: Marni Gauthier (of the DeLillo Society), Steven Frye (of the McCarthy Society), Yvonne Atkinson (of the Morrison Society), David Brauner (of the Roth Society), and Marshall Boswell (of the Updike Society).

Taking inspiration from the NYTBR poll, British newspaper The Observer conducted its own poll of 150 "literary luminaries" seeking their choice of the "best British, Irish or Commonwealth novel" published between 1980 and 2005. Disgrace, the 1999 novel by South African–Australian author J. M. Coetzee, received the most votes in The Observers poll. Comparing Disgrace and Beloved in an article for the Journal of Narrative Theory, Molly Abel Travis wrote: "What these two novels have in common, besides being profound and beautifully written narratives by Nobel laureates, is that they confront historical traumas and foreground the contested relationship between empathy and ethics through narrative distancing."

Criticisms
Laura Miller, who declined to participate in the poll, explained her reasoning and her view of the poll—and other such literary rankings of "classic books"—in a critical piece for Salon.com:

Lev Grossman of Time magazine called the poll results "aggressively boring" and continued, "it's a very staid, predictable, old, white (except for Morrison and Jones), and male (except for Morrison and Marilynne Robinson's Housekeeping) bunch. No surprise extra-canonical incursions. (No William Gibson? No Watchmen?)" Poet and critic Ron Silliman criticized the list for its narrow range of authors, particularly its gender inequality, with only two works written by women receiving more than one vote, writing: "Do we really think that more than one fourth of all the important novels over the past quarter century were written by one man? If so, do we honestly think they were written by Philip Roth? I'd poke my eyes out before I'd live on that planet." Silliman continued by suggesting that Tanenhaus and the poll respondents "should both get out more, venturing further north than Connecticut, further west than Riverside Drive, further south than Gramercy Park. It wouldn't hurt to meet women." Susan Straight lodged a similar complaint in the Los Angeles Times, in which she criticized the poll's evident bias toward the East Coast, particularly New York, to the detriment of writers from the Western United States and the geographically diverse tradition of American literary regionalism.

Reactions from authors named in the poll results
John Updike encountered the poll results shortly after their announcement at BookExpo America, where he was promoting his latest novel, Terrorist. His reaction to the list was observed in real time by Patti Thorn of Rocky Mountain News, who reported he "breathed a sigh of relief" when he saw his name on the list at third place. "Sometime later," he told Thorn, "you wonder why these other books came first." He continued, "I feel awkward about any award. [These polls turn] literature into a kind of track meet, where you can judge first, second and third ... I wonder if the discontent it breeds doesn't offset the joy of the winners."

Michael Cunningham—a participant in the poll himself, whose own novel The Hours also received a single vote from a fellow author—praised the poll's top five novels for capturing a sense of the zeitgeist when taken as an aggregate whole. Cunningham then emphasized the difference between the criteria to name a greatest book of its time versus the personal criteria to name a favorite book. For example, he said he regarded Nicholson Baker's 1988 novel The Mezzanine as not just a personal favorite, but a book he would recommend to an English-literate extraterrestrial lifeform to "convey a sense of American life right now"; nevertheless, he deemed The Mezzanine too unusual, too experimental, and too radical in its modernist style to qualify, in his view, as a definitive "best" book representing its era.

Notes

References

Sources

External links 
 "What Is the Best Work of American Fiction of the Last 25 Years?" at NYTimes.com
 "In Search of the Best" – accompanying essay by A. O. Scott

2006 documents
1980s in literature
1990s in literature
2000s in literature
20th-century American literature
21st-century American literature
American literature-related lists
Literary criticism
Literary debates
Lists of American books
Top book lists
Works originally published in The New York Times